The Forbidden Forest of The Upper Cibeet River is a sacred wooded area in an old tropical forest Dayeuhluhur, in the north Cilacap Regency of Central Java, Indonesia.

Key Keeper
Visitors must be accompanied by a Key Keeper, to ensure proper respect for Dayeuhluhurian culture. They claim the forest to be one of spirituality. The Juru Kunci, or key keeper is Ceceng Rusmana from Cibeet River.

Flora and fauna

Similar to Ujung Kulon National Park, the forest hosts tropical and rare animals and trees, including many Rusa (genus) Javan leopard and monkeys. People in this area believe that the Javan tiger and banteng still live there. This forest also contains many species of wild orchid.

River source
Many rivers have their headwaters in the region of the Upper Cibeet. Some drain to the north into the Java Sea like Cipamali River, while others drain to the south in the Indian Ocean, like the Cibeet River, Cidayeuh River and Cikawalon River.

Mitos

A common belief in Mitos forbids speaking or asking about anything seen in the forest. Another holds that spitting (showing disrespect) while in the forest will cause leeches to attack, making them the real guardian.

Blood worm (leech)

The blood worm (Pacet) is common in the forest. This leech does not live in water but crawls everywhere on land and trees, not unlike the worm or caterpillar, in search of animals (including people) to feed on.

References

Dayeuhluhur
Sacred natural sites
Geography of Central Java
Forests of Indonesia
Cilacap Regency